Olena Rodina (born 17 May 1975) is a Ukrainian cross-country skier. She competed in three events at the 2002 Winter Olympics.

References

External links
 

1975 births
Living people
Ukrainian female cross-country skiers
Olympic cross-country skiers of Ukraine
Cross-country skiers at the 2002 Winter Olympics
Place of birth missing (living people)